James Edward Shadid (born September 27, 1957) is a United States district judge of the United States District Court for the Central District of Illinois.

Early life and education

Shadid was born in 1957 in Peoria, Illinois. His father was George Shadid, who eventually became sheriff of Peoria County, Illinois and an Illinois state senator. Shadid earned a Bachelor of Science from Bradley University in 1979 and his Juris Doctor from John Marshall Law School in Chicago in 1983.

Career 

Shadid was in private practice from 1983 to 2001, additionally acting as part-time public defender in Peoria County from 1986 to 2001 and a commissioner of the Illinois Court of Claims from 1996 to 2001. In December 2001, Shadid was appointed to the Tenth Judicial Circuit of Illinois. He was primarily in felony court, with other work in misdemeanor and civil court.

Federal judicial service 

On May 27, 2010, President Barack Obama nominated Shadid to replace Michael Mihm on the United States District Court for the Central District of Illinois. On March 7, 2011, he was confirmed by the Senate by an 89–0 vote. He received his commission on March 10, 2011. Shadid served as the chief judge of the Central District from March 12, 2012, to March 12, 2019; he was sworn in by his predecessor Judge Michael P. McCuskey.

References

External links

1957 births
Living people
American people of Lebanese descent
Bradley Braves men's basketball players
Bradley University faculty
Illinois state court judges
Judges of the United States District Court for the Central District of Illinois
People from Peoria, Illinois
Public defenders
United States district court judges appointed by Barack Obama
21st-century American judges
John Marshall Law School (Chicago) alumni
American men's basketball players